Abdulla the Great (also known as Abdullah's Harem) is a 1955 comedy film. It was directed and produced by Gregory Ratoff who also stars in the title role from a screenplay by Boris Ingster and George St. George, based on the novel My Kingdom for a Woman by Ismet Regeila. The music score was by Georges Auric and the cinematography by Lee Garmes.

The film stars Gregory Ratoff, Kay Kendall, Sydney Chaplin, Alexander D'Arcy and Marina Berti. Ratoff denied that the story was a thinly veiled parody of the life of King Farouk of Egypt and the events preceding his overthrow in 1952.

Plot
The film is set in Bandaria, a Middle Eastern country whose absolute ruler, Abdullah (Gregory Ratoff),  lives a life of great luxury, surrounded by lovely women. When Ronnie, a beautiful English model (Kay Kendall), arrives, Abdullah falls for her and offers her great riches. She resists his advances as she is more interested in Ahmed (Sydney Chaplin), an officer in the King's army. While this is going on, Abdullah is unaware of the growing discontent among his subjects which threatens to overthrow him.

Cast
Gregory Ratoff as Abdulla
Kay Kendall  as Ronnie
Sydney Chaplin  as Ahmed
Alexander D'Arcy as Marco
Marina Berti as Aziza
 Mary Costes as The Countess
 Marti Stevens as Singer

References

External links
 
 

1955 films
British comedy films
Egyptian comedy films
1950s English-language films
Films based on novels
Films directed by Gregory Ratoff
Films scored by Georges Auric
Films set in a fictional country
Films shot in Egypt
Films set in Asia
Films à clef
British Lion Films films
1955 comedy films
1950s British films